Uncle Jamm's Army was an American funk/hip hop collective crew based in Los Angeles, California, in the 1980s. Their singles "What's Your Sign", "Dial-a-Freak", and "Yes, Yes, Yes" were influential to the electro, old school funk, and early West Coast hip-hop genres.

History 

In 1978, Arthur "Gid" Martin, and his brothers Tony Martin and Greg Martin were giving parties at Alpine Village in Torrance California that were attracting huge crowds from all over the cities of Carson, San Pedro, Gardena, Westchester, Compton, Los Angeles, and Harbor City, where they attended Narbonne High School.  The crew recruited hommies to pass out flyers at high school football games and local events.  Roger Clayton had been entertaining  huge crowds at his family home in Palo Del Amo Woods, where the Martins and Claytons both lived, building a fanatical following and honing his DJ skills and team.  The two powerhouses, Martin Brothers Productions and Roger Clayton joined forces as Unique Dreams Entertainment to take the Alpine Village dances to another level.  Using radio ads, especially on 102.3 FM KJLH and 1580 AM KDAY, and dayglow posters plastered all over the county of Los Angeles using staple guns, they out-promoted and outworked their competition until they owned the dance scene in Los Angeles. They quickly outgrew Alpine Village, expanding and moving their moveable party all over the city.  The Bonaventure Hotel.  The Hilton Ballroom.  In September 1979, Funkadelic released an album entitled Uncle Jam Wants You. The name Uncle Jamm's Army was adopted by Clayton and the Martins. 

By the beginning of the 1980s, the Army's popularity had grown to a feverish pitch. Summer 1980 brought "Shake Your Pants" and what later to be known as "The Twins", "4th of July" and "Labor Day Groove". They also played Long Beach State; Veteran's Auditorium, Culver City; Pasadena and Santa Monica Convention Centers; the Hollywood Palladium.  Ultimately, only the Sports Arena could hold the crowds of LA party seekers.

When the LA rap scene erupted, it was Uncle Jamm's army who put them on the big stage.  You can see an Uncle Jamm's Army poster as NWA ascends the steps to their first show in the movie Straight Outa Compton.  They built the platform from which West Coast Hip Hop launched to global fame, driven by Roger's intense charisma and desire to be successful in the entertainment business, paired beautifully with Gid's marketing acumen, organizational skills, and mastery of relationships.  The two shared a great sense of humor, and made it through some tough encounters with financiers, competitors, and acts, in the early days of Hip Hop.  Some of the stories are captured in a documentary produced by Red Bull.  

The group also put out original music.  Uncle Jamm's Army was among the earliest hip-hop groups on the West Coast and helped to bring the electro scene to Los Angeles. The group was influenced by Prince, Kraftwerk and East Coast electro. In the beginning, the Army first played funky disco but when Sugarhill Records started putting out rap and funk hits, rap had finally reached the West Coast.

In 1982, Rodger opened a music store, The DJ Booth (Slauson & Western Avenue), catering to all the local DJs and selling 12-inch records.
In 1983, the DJ group expanded further and Uncle Jamm's recruited underground DJs and MCs who were creating a cult following. The most well-known being Greg "Egyptian Lover" Broussard, Tracy "Ice-T" Marrow, who was later a gangsta rap pioneer and a singer of the thrash metal band Body Count, and later Mark "DJ Pooh" Jordan, best known for producing 3 Strikes and Friday 1, 2 & 3, and Bobby "DJ Bobcat" Ervin (Death Row Records). The group name dropped the second 'm', changing to Uncle Jam's Army. The electronic sound of the group was influential on West Coast hip hop, as G-Funk pioneered by Dr. Dre continued the tradition of an electronic sound in hip-hop music.

By 1988 the group disbanded as the music in the industry changed to gangsta rap, with violence in the lyrics and at the shows.

Discography

Singles 
"Dial-a-Freak" (1984), Freak Beat – 12-inch single
"Dial-a-Freak (10 Minute Remix)" (1984), Dunk Yer Funk – 12-inch single
"Yes, Yes, Yes" (1984), Freak Beat
"What's Your Sign" (1985), Freak Beat – 12-inch single
"The Roach Is On The Wall" (1985), Freak Beat – 12-inch single
"Naughty Boy" (1986), Freak Beat – 12-inch single

References

External links 

Hip hop groups from California
Musical groups from Los Angeles
Musical groups established in 1978
Musical groups disestablished in 1988
1978 establishments in California
1988 disestablishments in California